The Conservative Party of New York State is an American political party founded in 1962 following conservative dissatisfaction with the Republican Party in New York. Running on the Conservative Party line, James L. Buckley won election to the U.S. Senate in 1970 and served for one term. Since 2010, the party has held "Row C" on New York ballots—the third-place ballot position, directly below the Democratic and Republican parties—because it received the third-highest number of votes of any political party in the 2010, 2014 and 2018 New York gubernatorial elections. The party is known for its strategy of attempting to influence the Republican Party in a more conservative direction.

History

The Conservative Party of New York State was founded in 1962 by a group including J. Daniel Mahoney, Kieran O'Doherty, Charles E. Rice, Raymond R. Walker and Charles Edison, out of frustration with the perceived liberalism of the state's Republican Party.  A key consideration was New York's fusion voting, unusual among U.S. states, which allows individual candidates to appear on multiple party lines in the same election.  The Liberal Party of New York, founded in 1944, had benefited from this system; the Conservative Party desired to balance the Liberal Party's influence. According to The New York Times, the party's support "came mainly from those who would later be called Reagan Democrats—working-class, urban and suburban, often Catholic."

1960s
Prominent conservative author and commentator William F. Buckley Jr. ran for Mayor of New York City on the Conservative Party line in 1965, winning 13.4% of the vote. An op-ed in The New York Times described the Buckley campaign as "a watershed campaign for the Conservatives, who gained heavy publicity and proved their strength in the overwhelmingly Democratic city." In 1966, Conservative candidate Paul L. Adams obtained more than half a million votes in his race for Governor of New York, winning Row C for the Party.

1970s
In 1970, James Buckley, the brother of William F. Buckley Jr., ran for U.S. Senate as the candidate of the Conservative Party. Running only on the Conservative Party line and the Independent Alliance Party line, Buckley defeated Democratic Congressman Richard Ottinger and unelected incumbent Republican U.S. Senator Charles Goodell, receiving 39% of the vote. Buckley served one term in the Senate. According to the New York Post, "Buckley's victory cemented, for a time, an electoral coalition of urban, ethnic Democrats with rural and suburban Republicans—all disgusted with excessive taxation, runaway government spending and the decline of traditional values." In 1976, Buckley ran for reelection to the U.S. Senate as the candidate of the Republican and Conservative parties, losing to Democrat Daniel Patrick Moynihan.

In 1978, registered Conservative William Carney, a member of the Suffolk County legislature, was elected to the United States House of Representatives in New York's 1st congressional district, a long-time Democratic stronghold on Long Island, after winning the Republican primary and running on both party lines. He eventually served four terms before retiring.

1980s
In 1980, the Conservative Party endorsed Al D'Amato in a U.S. Senate race in which he successfully challenged incumbent Sen. Jacob Javits in a Republican primary. D'Amato then narrowly prevailed in the general election over Democrat Elizabeth Holtzman; the 275,100 votes D'Amato received on the Conservative line exceeded his slim margin of victory.

In the 1982 gubernatorial election, the party nominated Republican Lewis Lehrman, who was narrowly defeated by Democrat Mario Cuomo. In the 1986 gubernatorial election, the party nominated Republican Andrew P. O'Rourke, who was defeated by Cuomo in a landslide.

1990s
Herbert London was the Conservative Party's nominee for Governor of New York in 1990; that year, the party broke from the Republican Party, declining to cross-endorse Republican nominee Pierre Rinfret. Conservatives leaders cited Rinfret's support for abortion, his perceived lack of seriousness about his candidacy, and his potential difficulties in attacking incumbent Democratic Governor Mario Cuomo on fiscal policies as reasons for their decision to support London instead. London ran a strong campaign statewide and finished one percentage point behind Rinfret, while Democratic Governor Mario Cuomo easily won re-election.

The party declined to endorse Republican Rudy Giuliani for Mayor of New York City in his successful 1993 and 1997 campaigns. In each of those elections, Giuliani accepted the endorsement of the Liberal Party. The Conservative Party endorsed George Marlin for Mayor in 1993 and left its line blank in the 1997 New York City mayoral race.

The party endorsed Republican George Pataki in his successful 1994 campaign to unseat incumbent Democratic Gov. Mario Cuomo. In that race, Pataki "drew more than 300,000 votes on the Conservative line, double his slender winning margin over Mr. Cuomo."

2000s
The party ran its own candidates for Mayor of New York City in the 2001, 2005, and 2009, declining to support successful Republican candidate Michael Bloomberg.

John Spencer, a former mayor of Yonkers, New York, was nominated for U.S. Senate by the Republican and Conservative Parties in the 2006 Senate election against Hillary Clinton. Spencer was defeated by Clinton.

In the 2006 race for governor, Conservative Party Chairman Michael Long endorsed John Faso, the former Assembly Minority Leader and Republican State Comptroller nominee in 2002. Faso won the nomination at the Republican convention, defeating former Massachusetts Gov. Bill Weld, 61–39%. Following the convention, Weld withdrew from the race as senior party officials (including state Republican chairman Stephen Minarik, who endorsed Weld) urged party unity. In the general election, Faso was the nominee of both the Republican and Conservative parties, but was defeated by Eliot Spitzer. 

The Conservative Party nominated Republican candidates John McCain and Sarah Palin for president and vice president in the 2008 election, which was won by Democrat Barack Obama.

The Conservative Party nominated Doug Hoffman for the 2009 special election in New York's 23rd congressional district, an election won by the Democratic nominee, Bill Owens. The Conservative Party chose Hoffman, a fiscal and social conservative, in reaction to the Republican Party's nomination of pro-choice, pro-same-sex-marriage, pro-union Assemblymember Dede Scozzafava, who Chairman Mike Long declared to be a "nice lady who is too liberal."  On October 31, 2009, Scozzafava suspended her campaign, leading prominent Republicans such as national chairman Michael Steele to endorse Hoffman. On Election Day, Owens prevailed over Hoffman by a margin of 48.3% to 46%. The 2009 special election received significant national attention, and was alternately described as "a referendum on President Barack Obama" and "a fight over the identity of the Republican Party." According to one commentator, "tea party conservatives see the GOP loss as a victory for conservativism over mere political party loyalty. They're describing the defeat as a warning shot fired in defense of principle." In addition, elected officials and observers opined that the congressional race affected the New York State Senate's December 2, 2009 vote against same-sex marriage legislation.

2010s
Party Chairman Michael Long endorsed Rick Lazio for the 2010 New York gubernatorial election and directed his allies to do the same. However, several county chairmen instead coalesced behind vice chairman Ralph Lorigo. Lazio defeated Lorigo in the primary election by a roughly 60–40% margin, but was defeated by Carl Paladino in the Republican primary. Lazio dropped out of the race on September 27, requiring a vacancy committee to convene and select a replacement for him on the Conservative line. Long eventually endorsed Paladino and the vacancy committee followed, placing Paladino on the Conservative Party line. Paladino lost the general election, but drew 232,264 votes on the Conservative Party line, which allowed the party to overtake the Independence Party of New York and retake Row C (the third place ballot position in New York elections) for the first time since the 1998 elections. The party has held Row C ever since. 

Prior to the passage of same-sex marriage legislation in 2011, Long stated that the party would not endorse any candidate who supported same-sex marriage. Four Republican state senators—Sens. James Alesi, Mark Grisanti, Roy McDonald, and Stephen Saland—voted in favor of same-sex marriage. Alesi did not seek re-election in 2012, while Grisanti, McDonald, and Saland faced challengers in 2012 who received the Conservative Party's endorsement.  Grisanti was re-elected to the State Senate, while McDonald was defeated in a Republican primary and Saland was defeated in a general election in which a Conservative Party-endorsed challenger acted as a spoiler.

State Senator Mark Grisanti, the last remaining Republican state senator to have voted for the Marriage Equality Act, was again denied Conservative Party endorsement in 2014; the party instead endorsed dummy candidate Timothy Gallagher in State Senate District 60. Grisanti lost the Republican primary, but remained in the general election on the Independence line. In the general election, Gallagher—despite not campaigning at all—won 8 percent of the vote; the vote split between Gallagher, Grisanti, and Republican candidate Kevin Stocker allowed Democrat Marc Panepinto to win the election with only 34 percent of the vote.

The Party endorsed Rob Astorino very early in the 2014 gubernatorial election process. In the election for New York State Comptroller, the party threatened to nominate its own candidate if the Republicans could not find a candidate from their party to run on the line; the GOP eventually nominated Onondaga County Comptroller Rob Antonacci.

In 2016, the Conservative Party nominated eventual winner Donald Trump for President of the United States.

On April 13, 2018, the Conservative Party executive committee selected Marcus Molinaro as its candidate in the 2018 gubernatorial election in what Long termed a "not very easy" decision; the party chose Molinaro over Deputy State Senate Majority Leader John A. DeFrancisco and openly refused to consider Erie County Executive Joel Giambra.

The Conservative Party of Cattaraugus County is alleged to have been the target of a hostile takeover by members of the Republican Party, after 37 former Republicans abruptly changed party registration in October 2017. County party chairman Leonard Ciros alleged that the Republican Party violated state party loyalty laws and the federal Racketeer Influenced and Corrupt Organizations Act.

As of 2018, the Party holds "Row C" on New York ballots—the third-place ballot position, directly below the Democratic and Republican parties—because it received the third-highest number of votes of any political party in the 2010, 2014, and 2018 gubernatorial elections.

Long announced his retirement from the chairmanship of the Conservative Party on January 28, 2019 after having served in that role for 30 years. In February 2019, he was elected Chairman Emeritus of the Party. On February 23, 2019, the Party named Gerard Kassar of Brooklyn as its new chairman.

2020s 
In 2020, the Conservative Party nominated incumbent Republican President Donald Trump for re-election to the presidency. Trump was defeated by Democrat Joe Biden. In 2021, the Conservative Party successfully teamed up with the Republican Party to raise opposition among the state's voters and defeat three ballot initiatives proposed by Democrats.

Strategy and reputation
In 2012, The New York Times stated that the Conservative Party had "a successful electoral record in a decidedly blue state in which the Conservatives have elbowed the Republican Party to the right". Also in 2012, the New York Post asserted that the Party had "helped the GOP maintain its majority in the state Senate, even as New York has turned an ever-deeper blue over the last half century" and added that it had "forced the state Republican Party to (sometimes) remember what it stood for—by threatening its power".

Rather than nominating its own candidates, the Conservative Party usually endorses the same candidates as the Republican Party and campaigns against the Democratic candidates. However, the party has withheld support from Republican candidates if it deems them too liberal. For example, the Conservative Party withheld its support from Republican Rudy Giuliani's fusion campaigns with endorsement from the Liberal Party for New York City mayor in 1989, 1993 and 1997. In the 2004 U.S. Senate election, the Conservative Party endorsed Marilyn O'Grady to oppose Republican candidate Howard Mills and incumbent Democratic Senator Charles Schumer. Also in 2004, the Party's decision to endorse Tom Dadey rather than incumbent Republican State Senator Nancy Larraine Hoffmann in State Senate District 49 helped bring about the victory of Democrat David Valesky in that race. After losing to Hoffmann in the Republican primary, Dadey—with the support of the Conservative Party and the Independence Party—remained in the race; Hoffmann lost the general election by 742 votes.

Following the passage of same-sex marriage legislation in 2011, the Conservative Party stated that it would withdraw support for any candidate who had voted for the bill; two Republican senators who voted for same-sex marriage—Roy McDonald and Stephen Saland—lost their seats in 2012.

The party has also endorsed Democratic candidates, including controversial former Buffalo mayor and presidential candidate Jimmy Griffin, who was initially elected mayor solely on the Conservative ticket but had Republican support as well for his subsequent campaigns. It also cross-endorsed such Democrats as Asms. Michael Cusick, Michael P. Kearns, and Robin Schimminger and former Capital District Congressman Michael McNulty.

Officeholders from the New York Conservative Party

Federal office

James L. Buckley, Senator, 1971–1977
William Carney, U.S. Congressman, 1979–1987

State office

Rosemary R. Gunning, Assemblywoman, 1969–1976
Charles A. Jerabek, Assemblyman, 1969–1972
Angela Wozniak, Assemblywoman, 2015–2016
Joseph Lorigo, New York State Supreme Court justice, 2023–present

Electoral History

New York State Offices

New York Federal Offices

See also
Conservative Party (United States)
Electoral history of the Conservative Party of New York State

References

Bibliography

External links

BUCKLEY, James Lane (1923-) Biographical Information, Congressional biography, the Conservative Party's former U.S. Senator.

1962 establishments in New York (state)
Political parties established in 1962
Political parties in New York (state)
Political parties in the United States
Regional and state political parties in New York (state)
State and local conservative parties in the United States